Ademuz is the complex of twin skyscrapers Ademuz 1 and Ademuz 2. They are located in Valencia, Spain. Completed in 2003, Ademuz 1 has 26 floors, Ademuz 2 has 24 floors, and both have a height 90 metres. These are some of the tallest buildings in the city, lower than Hilton Valencia, Torre de Francia, Aqua Multiespacio; have the same height as the very similar Torres Llaves de Oro. Ademuz 1 is residential building, Ademuz 1 is hotel.

See also 

 List of tallest buildings in Valencia

References 

Skyscrapers in Valencia
Residential buildings completed in 2003
Residential skyscrapers in Spain
Skyscraper hotels in Spain
Hotels in Spain